Hodge's Coaches is a family owned coach operator based in Sandhurst, Berkshire.

History

The coach company was founded in 1924 by George Edward Hodge and still operates from the same site in Sandhurst, Berkshire. Before operating coaches George Hodge operated trucks from the same site, Deepnell Garage which was next door to his brother Walter's shoe repair shop. History of Sandhurst. The company was taken over and modernised by the founders eldest son Peter R Hodge in 1962, he continued to operate successfully until retiring in 2001, the company is now owned and operated by three of his sons Mark, Martin and Paul Hodge.

Fleet
The majority of Hodge's Coaches fleet are painted in a distinctive blue and gold livery, although there are several in plain white with just Hodge's logo's applied. The fleet consists of mainly Volvo and Scania vehicles although in 2011 three MAN Fast Buses were purchased. In 2013/2014 six Scanias will be delivered and a 70-seater Plaxton Leopard was also delivered in 2014.

Services
Hodge's operates a 25 vehicle fleet of various sizes ranging from 16 to 70 seater vehicles, they specialise in corporate transport, private hire and home to school transport and club/society travel. The 57 seater MANs are a popular vehicle on school swimming contracts and as shuttle vehicles between venues, this may be due to the high seating capacity and the front and rear kerbside doors which allows for easier loading and unloading of passengers.

References

External links

Coach operators in England
Transport in Berkshire
Transport in Hampshire
Transport in Surrey
Sandhurst, Berkshire
Transport operators of the United Kingdom
Companies based in Berkshire
British companies established in 1924
Transport companies established in 1923